Brazil competed in the 2017 Summer Deaflympics which was held in Samsun, Turkey. Brazil sent a delegation consisting of 101 participants for the event. This was the 9th consecutive time that Brazil was eligible to participate at the Summer Deaflympics since making its debut in 1985. 

Brazil managed to receive 5 medals in the event including one gold and 4 bronze medals.

Football 

Brazil Men's deaf football team competed in the Football tournament as a part of the 2017 Summer Deaflympics in Group D along with Great Britain, Russia and South Korea. The men's national team was eliminated from the group stage after losing all the group matches. The women's national deaf football team managed to secure a bronze medal in the football competition beating Great Britain in the 3rd place playoff.

Medalists

Medal table

References

External links 
 Brazil at the Deaflympics

Nations at the 2017 Summer Deaflympics
2017 in Brazilian sport
Brazil at the Deaflympics